Hurepoix is an area of the Île-de-France, to the southwest of Paris, situated between the departments of Yvelines, Hauts-de-Seine and Essonne. It was an old province of the French Kingdom and the main city was Dourdan.

Geography
This area is one of the biggest of the Île-de-France.

Limits :
North : Paris
West : Rambouillet and forest
East : Seine, Brie province, Fontainebleau and forest
South : Beauce province

Main cities

Dourdan
Limours
Orsay
Massy
Montlhéry
Palaiseau

Main rivers
Yvette
Bièvre
Essonne
Orge

Main forest
Dourdan
Verrières-le-Buisson

Main Castles

This area is not far from Versailles, and the castle of Louis XIV. In this period, Princes and Dukes built castles not far, in Hurepoix.

Chamarande
Breteuil 
Courson
Dampierre
Dourdan
Sceaux
Saint Jean de Beauregard

Economy
The economy of the west part of the area consists of farming, as in the past. The economy of the eastern part is more industrial.

Former provinces of France